Initiative for Democratic Socialism (IDS) was a Slovenian Marxist party, founded in 2014. Its collective leadership structure without an individual leader, inspired by Occupy Wall Street, was conceived by members of The Workers and Punks University in November 2013, and only allows for a coordinator of the IDS council, a position held by Luka Mesec, elected by the IDS council.

Program
Its program, based on The Workers and Punks University economic analysis, includes regulation of neoliberalism in the short run, and in the long run replacement of capitalism with democratic socialism.

International partners
The initiative is linked to the European Left together with other European new anti-capitalist parties, including German Die Linke, French Front de Gauche, and Portuguese Left Bloc.

2014 Elections
The United Left, a project that IDS joined, received 5.47 percent of the vote in the 2014 European Parliament election in Slovenia and 6.0 percent of the vote in the 2014 Slovenian parliamentary election.

References

2014 establishments in Slovenia
2017 disestablishments in Slovenia
Anti-capitalist political parties
Defunct political parties in Slovenia
Defunct socialist parties in Europe
Democratic socialist parties in Europe
Eurosceptic parties in Slovenia
Marxist parties in Slovenia
Party of the European Left former member parties
Political parties disestablished in 2014
Political parties established in 2014
Socialist parties in Slovenia